Nicholas Eduardo Alberto Cordero (September 17, 1978 – July 5, 2020) was a Canadian actor and singer. He was nominated for the Tony Award for Best Featured Actor in a Musical for his role as Cheech in the 2014 Broadway musical Bullets Over Broadway and was twice nominated for Drama Desk Awards. His career also included television and film roles.

Cordero died at age 41 from COVID-19-related complications after more than three months in the hospital.

Early life
Cordero was born and raised in Hamilton, Ontario, to a Canadian mother and a father from Costa Rica. He graduated from Westdale Secondary School in Hamilton and attended Ryerson University in Toronto for two years before dropping out to perform in the band Lovemethod.

Career
Cordero's acting debut was in the title role in the off-Broadway production of The Toxic Avenger. He also played the role of Dennis in Rock of Ages on Broadway in 2012 and on tour. Cordero appeared on Broadway in 2014 in the musical Bullets Over Broadway in the role of Cheech, for which he was nominated for the Tony Award for Best Featured Actor in a Musical and the Drama Desk Award for Outstanding Featured Actor in a Musical. He won the Outer Critics Circle Award for Outstanding Featured Actor in a Musical and a Theatre World Award for the role.

In March 2016, Cordero joined the Broadway production of Waitress, playing the role of Earl. He left Waitress to join the Broadway premiere of the musical A Bronx Tale, playing Sonny at the Longacre Theatre starting on November 3, 2016. For this role, Cordero was nominated for the Drama Desk Award for Outstanding Featured Actor in a Musical in 2017. Also in 2017, he portrayed Victor Lugo in "Out of the Blue" and "Heavy Is the Head", the fourth and tenth episodes of the eighth season of the CBS police procedural drama Blue Bloods. He reprised the role in 2018 in "Your Six", the twentieth episode of the eighth season of the show. In March 2020 Cordero moved to Los Angeles to work in a production of Rock of Ages.

Personal life
On September 3, 2017, Cordero married dancer Amanda Kloots in a formal ceremony. Their son was born in 2019.

Illness and death 
Cordero was initially diagnosed with pneumonia while staying with his wife and son at the guest house of former Bullets Over Broadway co-star Zach Braff.  He was admitted to a hospital on March 30, 2020, where he was later diagnosed with COVID-19 during the pandemic in Los Angeles.  Cordero was listed in critical condition, was placed on a ventilator, and was being treated with dialysis and extracorporeal membrane oxygenation (ECMO). 

On April 18, 2020, his right leg was amputated due to a blood clot as a result of complications from his illness. By May 1, 2020, he had major lung damage including "holes in his lungs" and lung scarring.  A tracheostomy tube was inserted to help him breathe.

On July 5, 2020, after 95 days in the hospital, Cordero died at Cedars-Sinai Medical Center in Los Angeles, at age 41. His body was cremated.

Memory 

On July 7, 2020, an effort was launched to rename the Longacre Theatre in Manhattan after Cordero. On September 2, 2021, the Broadway production of Waitress paid tribute to Cordero, with Kloots and the show's cast performing his single "Live Your Life". Additionally, the "Live Your Life Pie" has become a permanent part of the show's set and script. A film of a rooftop performance of a song from Bullets Over Broadway is dedicated to his memory, commemorating his portrayal of Cheech.

Filmography

Film

Television

Theatre

Awards and nominations

References

External links 
 
 Nick Cordero at the Internet Broadway Database
 Nick Cordero at the Internet Off-Broadway Database
 Nick Cordero Interview at Playbill.com
 

1978 births
2020 deaths
21st-century Canadian male actors
Canadian emigrants to the United States
Canadian male musical theatre actors
Male actors from Hamilton, Ontario
Theatre World Award winners
Canadian people of Costa Rican descent
Deaths from pulmonary fibrosis
Deaths from the COVID-19 pandemic in California